Frances Canby Griscom (19 April 1879 – March 30, 1973) was an American amateur golfer from Philadelphia, Pennsylvania, United States and part-time resident of Tallahassee, Florida.

Griscom won the 1900 U.S. Women's Amateur held at Shinnecock Hills Golf Club, Southampton, Long Island, New York.

Griscom was the daughter of shipping magnate Clement Griscom and the owner of the  Water Oak Plantation, a hunting plantation in Bradfordville north of Tallahassee, in Leon County, Florida. Griscom was a loyal contributor to the Lake McBride School, a school for African Americans near her winter home.

Griscom donated the putting cleat that she felt had won her the 1900 championship to the USGA museum in 1954 as before she was still playing golf with it.

References 

American female golfers
Amateur golfers
Winners of ladies' major amateur golf championships
Golfers from Tallahassee, Florida
Golfers from Philadelphia
People from Lower Merion Township, Pennsylvania
People from Leon County, Florida
1879 births
1973 deaths